No One Saw a Thing is an American documentary television series that was first shown on SundanceTV on August 1, 2019.

Production
On February 27, 2018, it was announced that SundanceTV had given a six-episode series order to No One Saw a Thing, a new documentary television series directed by Avi Belkin. The series was executive produced by Belkin, Alexandra Shiva, Jason Blum, Jeremy Gold, and Marci Wiseman. Production companies include Blumhouse Television.

Premise
No One Saw a Thing examines "an unsolved and mysterious death in the American Heartland and the effects of vigilantism in small town America. The case garnered international attention in the early 1980s after a resident, Ken Rex McElroy, was shot dead in front of almost 60 townspeople. These witnesses deny having seen anything, to this very day."

Episodes

Reception
Decider called it "amazing", where "Belkin does a good job of revisiting a case that captured the nation's — if not the world's — attention in the 1980s and brings some fresh perspective to it" by comparing the town's reactions via past archival shots and present interviews.

See also
In Broad Daylight (book)
In Broad Daylight (1991 film)

References

2019 American television series debuts
2010s American documentary television series
English-language television shows
Sundance TV original programming
True crime television series
Television shows set in Missouri